Damian may refer to:
Damian (given name)
Damian (surname)
Damian Subdistrict, in Longquanyi District, Chengdu, Sichuan, China

See also
Damiani, an Italian surname
Damiano (disambiguation)
Damien (disambiguation)
Damon (disambiguation)
Damion (disambiguation)